Time for the Moon Night is the sixth extended play (EP) by South Korean girl group GFriend. It was released by Source Music on April 30, 2018, and distributed by kakao M (formerly LOEN Entertainment). The album contains six songs, including the single of the same name, and two instrumental tracks.

"Time for the Moon Night", written by No Joo-hwan and Lee Won-jong, is GFriend's first single not written by producer duo Iggy and Youngbae.

Composition
Time for the Moon Night is more sentimental and dreamlike compared to GFriend's previous albums. According to member Umji, the group wanted to "set a new direction toward producing thought-provoking and sentimental music".

"Love Bug" is an upbeat song with a retro jazz sound, "Flower Garden" is retro synth-pop, and "Tik Tik" has a funky sound with Nu-disco beat. "Bye" is a pop ballad and "You Are My Star" is a sentimental song for GFriend's fans.

Release and promotions

After a seven-month break since the sextet's Summer Rain, GFriend officially returned with their 8th Mini Album: Time for the Moon Night, including their newest single in the same name on April 30, 2018. They release three versions of the album named: "Time Version", "Moon Version" and "Night Version". At the same day, GFriend held a comeback showcase entitled Moon Light: Express 241 at Yes24 Live Hall at Gwangjin-gu. The group performed the lead single, "Time for the Moon Night" and the sidetrack "Love Bug" at the media showcase, which was simultaneously broadcast live via Naver's V-Live app.

GFriend started promoting the album with the performances of their latest songs, "Time for the Moon Night" and "Love Bug" at MCountdown on May 3, 2018, preceding live stages on various music shows on the entire week. In their second week of promotion, the song won first place on every music show with a chart system, making GFriend the first and only artist to achieve a grandslam in 2018. GFriend ended their promotions on May 20, garnering a total of 10 trophies from all six music programs, it became the third among the group's lead singles with most number of wins, only behind Rough and Navillera.

Track listing

Personnel

Locations

 Recorded at VIBE Studio 
 Recorded at In Grid Studio 
 Recorded at Velvet Studio 
 Recorded at T Studio 
 Mixed at KoKo Sound Studio
 Mixed at In Grid Studio
 Mixed at Cube Studio
 Mixed at J's Atelier Studio
 Mixed at W Sound
 Mixed at Antenna Studio
 Mastered at 821 Sound Mastering

Vocal credits
 Yoon Bit-nara - backing vocals 
 Lee Dan-bi - backing vocals 
 Lee Won-jong - backing vocals 
 Yuju - backing vocals 
 Kim So-ri - backing vocals 
 Lee Ji-won - backing vocals 
 Sophia Pae - backing vocals 

Technical credits 

 Kim Ba-ro - arrangement , string arrangement 
 No Ju-hwan - programming , piano , keyboard , arrangement 
 Ryu Hyeon-woo - guitar 
 Jeong-jin - mixing 
 Lee Sang-deok - recording 
 Kwak Jeong-shin - recording 
 Jung Mo-yeon - recording , recording assistant , digital editing 
 Yoong String - strings 
 Kim Ye-il - bass guitar , arrangement 
 Lee Won-jong - programming 
 Jung Dong-yoon - drum 
 Go Hyeon-jung - mixing 
 Kim Joon-sang - mixing assistant 
 Jun Jin - mixing assistant 
 Jung Gi-woon - mixing assistant 
 Oh Sung-geun - recording 
 Baek Kyung-hoon - recording assistant 
 Ryan S. Jhun - vocal director 
 Jung Eun-kyung - recording, mixing 
 Woo Min-jung - recording assistant 
 Kwon Seok-hong - string arrangement 
 Young - guitar 
 Jo-ssi Ajeossi - mixing 
 Seo Yong-bae - drum programming 
 Iggy - piano, keyboard 
 Sin Min - string arrangement 
 Ha Hyung-joo - drum 
 Ji Seung-nam - mixing

Charts

Weekly charts

Year-end charts

Sales

See also

Notes

References

2018 EPs
Korean-language EPs
GFriend EPs
Kakao M EPs
Hybe Corporation EPs